Barbegazi are mythical creatures from Swiss and French mythology. A variety of dwarf or gnome, a barbegazi resembles a small white-furred man with a long beard and enormous feet. They travel in the mountains that are their home by skiing with their massive feet, or using them as snowshoes. In the summer they aestivate in caves and tunnels and do not come out until the first snowfall. The word barbegazi comes from the French barbe-glacée, meaning "frozen beard". Because of their penchant for high altitudes and low temperatures, they are rarely sighted by humans, but sometimes help shepherds round up lost sheep. Their greatest known excitement is surfing on avalanches with their remarkably large feet, but they are said to give low whistling cries to warn humans of the danger above, sometimes they will give their best effort to dig humans out from the snow.

A modern addition to this myth is the rumored migration of the Barbegazi to North America, predominantly to a locale of French origin in northwest Minnesota named Roseau County.  Numerous sightings have been reported along the Roseau River, in the depths of the often frigid northern Minnesota winters.

References

Swiss folklore
French legendary creatures
Dwarves (folklore)